Eucalyptus capitanea, commonly known as the desert ridge-fruited mallee, is a species of mallee that is endemic to South Australia. It often has rough, flaky bark on the lower part of the trunk, smooth bark above, lance-shaped adult leaves, ribbed, oval flower buds in groups of seven, cream-coloured flowers and ribbed, urn-shaped fruit.

Description
It has smooth greyish to brownish bark but often has rough, loose flaky bark on the lower part of the trunk. The leaves on young plants and on coppice regrowth are lance-shaped to egg-shaped, dull to bluish green at first and have a petiole.

Taxonomy and naming
Eucalyptus capitanea was first formally described in 2001 by Lawrie Johnson and Ken Hill from a specimen collected in 1984 by Ian Brooker near Koonibba . The description was published in the journal Telopea. The specific epithet (capitanea) is a Latin word meaning "chief in size" or "large", referring to the size of the leaves, flower buds and fruit compared to those of E. incrassata.

Distribution and habitat
This eucalypt grows in mallee vegetation on and between red sand dunes. It is found between the Great Victoria Desert and the western edge of the Gawler Ranges, especially in the Yumbarra Conservation Park in South Australia.

See also
List of Eucalyptus species

References

Flora of South Australia
Trees of Australia
capitanea
Myrtales of Australia
Plants described in 2001
Taxa named by Lawrence Alexander Sidney Johnson
Taxa named by Ken Hill (botanist)